Charles Mansfield Clarke may refer to:

Sir Charles Mansfield Clarke, 1st Baronet (1782–1857), English surgeon
Sir Charles Clarke, 3rd Baronet (1839–1932), English Quartermaster-General and Governor of Malta